Ascension Health St. Mary's Hospital (formerly Presence St. Mary's Hospital, AMITA Health St. Mary’s) is a non-profit hospital in Kankakee, Illinois. It is a 182-bed acute care facility with a Level II Emergency/Trauma Center. It is part of the Ascension healthcare system.

History
Originally known as the Emergency Hospital, Presence St. Mary's was opened in March 1897 by the Sister Servants of the Holy Heart of Mary.  In 1925, it was renamed St. Mary's Hospital.  In 1997, the Servants of the Holy Heart of Mary combined with the Franciscan Sisters of the Sacred Heart and Sisters of Mercy of Americas to form Provena Health, and the hospital name changed to Provena St. Mary's Hospital. This merger allowed the hospital to expand its services and increase the level of complete health care.

In 2012, Provena Health & Resurrection Health Care completed a merger and selected Presence Health as their new name. In 2018, the hospital's name was changed to AMITA Health St. Mary's Hospital after AMITA Health acquired Presence. In 2021, AMITA Health was dissolved when AdventHealth and Ascension ended their joint venture. AMITA St. Mary’s hospital became Ascension Saint Mary’s hospital.

Services
Key services include a Level II Trauma Center, regional emergency medical services, cancer care, diabetes and endocrinology services, mental health care, physical therapy, occupational therapy, wound care, cardiovascular and pulmonary care, hyperbaric therapy, stroke care, renal dialysis, birthing center, pediatric services, rehabilitation center, sleep lab, breast health center, and a women's health program, as well as home and hospice care.

Awards
In addition to awarding a 5-star rating for Total Knee Replacement and Joint Replacement Surgery in 2008, Health Grades ranked Presence St. Mary's among the Top 5 Hospitals in Illinois for Joint Replacement, in 2009. That same year, the hospital received accreditation from the Society of Chest Pain Centers, becoming one of 17 hospitals in Illinois receive that distinction. And in March 2010, Presence St. Mary's Hospital earned the Gold Seal of Approval from The Joint Commission for Advanced Primary Stroke Centers, for its provision of emergency stroke care.

In 2008, Presence St. Mary's Hospital completed a $2 million first-floor renovation project, for the purpose of enhancing patient comfort and care. That same year, the hospital was recognized by Health Grades for its patient outcomes, receiving a five-star rating for Total Knee Replacement and a five-star rating for Joint Replacement Surgery.

In 2008, 2009 & 2010 Presence St. Mary's Hospital received the Patient Safety Excellence Award from Health Grades, as well as their Pulmonary Care Excellence Award in 2010. And in 2011, it became one of 94 hospitals in the United States to receive the American College of Cardiology Foundation's NCDR ACTION Registry–GWTG Silver Performance Achievement Award. This award recognizes the hospital's standard of care for heart attack patients, in accordance with those standards outlined by the American College of Cardiology/American Heart Association clinical guidelines and recommendations.

Also in 2011, the national healthcare company Professional Research Consultants recognized four departments of Provena St. Mary's Hospital, as well as the hospital itself, with "Excellence in Healthcare Awards." The Family Birthing Center (inpatient OB/GYN), inpatient medical care (5E), and outpatient radiology (Bourbonnais Imaging) were 5-Star Award winners, for their overall quality of care. The Emergency Department and the hospital (administration, anesthesia services, nursing care, and surgical services received 4-Star Awards.

Locations

Campuses
Presence St. Mary's Kankakee Campus (Main) - Kankakee, IL
Presence St. Mary's Bourbonnais Campus - Bourbonnais, IL

Community Health Centers (clinics)
Presence MedCentre East -  Kankakee, IL
Presence MedCentre West - Kankakee, IL
Presence Central Community MedCentre - Clifton, IL
Presence Manteno MedCentre - Manteno, IL
Presence Peotone MedCentre - Peotone, IL

Other locations
Presence Heritage Village - Kankakee, IL
Presence Our Lady of Victory - Bourbonnais, IL
Presence Home Care - Bourbonnais, IL
Presence Intergenerational Center - Kankakee, IL
Presence St. Mary's MedCentre North - Bourbonnais, IL
Presence St. Mary's Breast Health Center - Bourbonnais, IL
Presence St. Mary's Regional Cancer Center - located at the Bourbonnais, IL campus
Presence St. Mary's Sleep Diagnostic Centre - located at MedCentre North (in Bourbonnais, IL)

References

External links
Official website
iTriage page

Hospital buildings completed in 1897
Hospitals in Illinois
Kankakee, Illinois
Buildings and structures in Kankakee County, Illinois